McCahill is a surname of Irish origin. The name refers to:

Persons
Crystal McCahill (born 1983), Playboy Playmate of the month May 2009
Jim McCahill (born 1939), English football chairman
Mark P. McCahill (born 1956), American developer of internet technology
Romy McCahill (born 1993), Scottish model and beauty pageant titleholder
Tom McCahill (1907–1975), American automotive journalist

See also
Cahill (disambiguation)